"Hang On Sloopy" (originally "My Girl Sloopy") is a 1964 song written by Wes Farrell and Bert Berns. Rhythm and blues vocal group the Vibrations were the first to record the tune in 1964. Atlantic Records released it as a single, which reached No. 26 on the Billboard Hot 100 chart. The song is associated with Ohio State University and is Ohio's official rock song.

The song became standard fare for garage bands and, in 1965, it became one of the first songs recorded by the Yardbirds with guitarist Jeff Beck. A version by the rock group the McCoys was the most successful, when it reached number one in the singles chart. Recordings by additional artists also reached the charts, including versions in Spanish and Portuguese.

By one account, the inspiration for the song was Dorothy Sloop, a jazz singer from Steubenville, Ohio, and a student at Ohio University.

McCoys version

In early 1965, the Strangeloves, a New York City rock band, wanted to make the song the follow-up to their hit single "I Want Candy" and began performing it in concert. However, the Dave Clark Five, with whom they were touring, told the Strangeloves that they were going to record their own version when they returned to England, copying the Strangeloves' arrangement. The Strangeloves realized that the Dave Clark Five's cut would likely be a hit, but they were not yet ready to release a new single because they were still enjoying the success of "I Want Candy" from a few months earlier. 

The answer presented itself when a young rock group named Rick and the Raiders opened (and provided backing) for the Strangeloves in July in Dayton, Ohio. The Strangeloves, three writer-producers from Brooklyn, New York City, recruited Rick and the Raiders to record the song under their name. Their 16-year-old leader, Rick Zehringer, was flown to Bell Sound Studios in New York to record his lead vocal over the Strangeloves' already-recorded backing tracks. It was decided to change the name of Rick's group to the McCoys to avoid confusion with another popular band at the time, Paul Revere & the Raiders, and Rick began using the stage name Rick Derringer. The single was issued on Bang Records and entered the chart on August 14, 1965. It reached the top position on October 2. Contrary to the Strangeloves' expectations, the Dave Clark Five version was never even released.

Originally written and recorded with three verses, the retitled "Hang On Sloopy" was edited down to two verses for the single and resulting Hang On Sloopy album. The unedited three-verse version, at 3 minutes, 50 seconds, first appeared on the 1970 Bang various artists compilation Bang & Shout Super Hits (BLPS-220), then again on the 1991 Rhino Records various artists compilation Grandson of Frat Rock! Vol. 3 and the 1995 Legacy Recordings compilation Hang On Sloopy: The Best of the McCoys.

Legacy

The Yardbirds
In 1964, Eric Clapton, who was then lead guitarist for the Yardbirds, introduced the group to the Vibration's "My Girl Sloopy". Before they could record the tune, however, Clapton left the group. During his second recording session on April 13, 1965, with the Yardbirds, new guitarist Jeff Beck and the group recorded the song at the Advision Studios in London. Their 5:36 rendition was considered unusual for a studio recording at the time; AllMusic's Bruce Eder called it "the first extended jam to emerge on record from a band on the British blues scene". Group chronicler Greg Russo also commented on the group's "humorous take [in which they] used out of control vocal buildups", which was part of their live performances, such as at the fifth Richmond National Jazz and Blues Festival on August 6.

When looking for material for the Yardbirds' first American album, manager Giorgio Gomelsky included "My Girl Sloopy" and two other tracks recorded at Advision with Beck. The hastily produced album was released on July 5, 1965, to generate interest for the group's upcoming first US tour. On August 11, the three songs formed the Yardbirds' first extended play (EP) release in the UK, where it reached number two on the record chart.

Other charting versions
Little Caesar and the Consuls released a version of the song in 1965 that reached No. 50 on the Billboard pop chart and No. 3 in Canada. 
The Ramsey Lewis Trio recorded the song for their 1965 live album Hang On Ramsey!; it reached No. 6 on the US R&B chart, No. 11 on the US pop chart, No. 18 on the US adult contemporary chart, and No. 37 in Canada.
"Es Lupe", a Spanish-language cover version by Los Johnny Jets, was released in 1965. It topped the Mexican charts for 13 weeks.
Leno e Lílian, a Brazilian vocal duo, released a cover version in Portuguese (“Pobre Menina”) in January 1966 that topped the Brazilian charts.
The Lettermen released a version of the song in 1970 that reached No. 18 on the US adult contemporary chart and No. 93 on the Billboard Hot 100.
Rick Derringer released a version of the song in 1975 that reached No. 94 on the Billboard Hot 100 and No. 81 in Canada.
The Sandpipers released a version of the song in 1976 that reached No. 32 on the UK Singles Chart.

Ohio State University
The song gained an association with Ohio State University after its marching band began playing it at football games. It first played the song October 9, 1965, after a staff arranger, John Tatgenhorst, begged the director to try playing it. After finally convincing the director, Tatgenhorst prepared an arrangement and the band played the song in front of the stadium. After the crowd reaction, the band began to play it at every game. The song is traditionally played during the transition from the 3rd quarter to the 4th quarter at Ohio Stadium. Since then, "Sloopy" has been appearing on the band's CDs and was available as a free download on its website. A vocal performance excerpt is also available for download on the university's website. 

Home games of professional sports teams throughout Ohio also feature the song. As is the case at Ohio State, fans usually chant the letters "O, H, I, O" during the pauses in the chorus while mimicking the shape of the letters with their arms. 

Bruce Springsteen and the E Street Band covered this song live in concert at the university's Schottenstein Center in 1999. When the Rolling Stones played Ohio Stadium on May 30, 2015, as part of their Zip Code Tour, they also performed the song.

Official rock song of the state of Ohio
Later it became the official rock song of the state of Ohio and Ohio State University. In April 1985, Joe Dirck, columnist for the Columbus Citizen-Journal, saw a wire service story about a proposal to designate "Louie, Louie" as the official State song of Washington, and he subsequently wrote a series of tongue-in-cheek columns. He even registered as a lobbyist for the resolution. Dirck played bass guitar in rock bands and knew the McCoys, particularly Rick Derringer. He said it was a good fit because the McCoys were from the Dayton area, and Ohio State marching band had adopted it as an unofficial anthem. Both the public and its elected officials—most importantly, the 116th Ohio General Assembly became aware their State lacked an official song as a result of the exposure from his commentary. They designated "Hang On Sloopy" as the state rock song by House Concurrent Resolution 16 on November 20, 1985, with clauses including:

and

Professional sports
"Hang On Sloopy" is also a signature song for Major League Baseball's Cleveland Guardians, who play at Progressive Field in Cleveland, Ohio, typically played during the middle of the 8th inning. The song also plays at the end of the 3rd quarter at FirstEnergy Stadium during every Cleveland Browns game, and is also played at Cleveland Cavaliers games at Rocket Mortgage FieldHouse. During games it is common for fans to yell "O-H-I-O!" following the chorus.

References

Bibliography

1964 songs
1964 singles
1965 debut singles
1970 singles
1975 singles
1976 singles
Songs written by Bert Berns
Songs written by Wes Farrell
The McCoys songs
Billboard Hot 100 number-one singles
Cashbox number-one singles
Atlantic Records singles
Bang Records singles
Cadet Records singles
Capitol Records singles
The Lettermen songs
The Sandpipers songs
Ohio State University
Ohio State University Spirit and Traditions
Music of Ohio
Ohio
American college songs
College fight songs in the United States
Big Ten Conference fight songs
Symbols of Ohio
Football songs and chants